Manitoba's Porcupine Provincial Forest lies adjacent to the province's western border (with Saskatchewan). The forest has an area of 2,090 km² (807 sq mi) and is located mostly in an unorganized part of Census Division No. 20, with small parts of it extending southward into the Rural Municipality of Swan River, and eastward into the Rural Municipality of Mountain, both of which are in the same census division.

See also
Porcupine Provincial Forest
Provincial forests (Manitoba)
Porcupine Hills

External links
 Manitoba's Provincial Forests: Manitoba Conservation Department

Forests of Manitoba